Nashik Lok Sabha constituency is one of the 48 Lok Sabha (parliamentary) constituencies of Maharashtra state in western India.

Vidhan Sabha segments
Presently, after the implementation of delimitation of the parliamentary constituencies in 2008, Nashik Lok Sabha constituency comprises the following six Vidhan Sabha (Legislative Assembly) segments:

Members of Parliament

^ by-poll

Election results

1952 Lok Sabha Election
 Govind Hari Deshpande (INC) : 89,261 votes    
 Narayanrao Ganpatrao Zodge  (Samajwadi Paksha) : 45,600

2004

2009 Lok Sabha

2014

2019

See also
 Nashik district
 List of Constituencies of the Lok Sabha

References

External links
Nashik lok sabha  constituency election 2019 results details

Lok Sabha constituencies in Maharashtra
Nashik district